Maxim Sorokin (22 January 1968 – 30 June 2007) was a Russian chess Grandmaster (1992). In 1998–2002 he played for Argentina.

In 2004 he tied for first with Saidali Iuldachev in the Murzagaliev Memorial in Uralsk, Kazakhstan. In 2007 he coached Sergei Rublevsky in the 2007 Candidates matches in Elista. Sorokin died on 30 June 2007 due to complications from a recent automobile accident.

References

External links

ChessBase.com - Chess News - GM Maxim Sorokin dies after traffic accident

1968 births
2007 deaths
Chess grandmasters
Chess coaches
Russian chess players
Argentine chess players
Road incident deaths in Russia
Moscow Institute of Physics and Technology alumni
20th-century chess players